The 2022–23 season is the 84th in the history of F.C. Vizela and their second consecutive season in the top flight. The club will participate in the Primeira Liga, the Taça de Portugal, and the Taça da Liga.

Players

Out on loan

Transfers

In

Out

Pre-season and friendlies

Competitions

Overall record

Primeira Liga

League table

Results summary

Results by round

Matches 
The league fixtures were announced on 5 July 2022.

Taça de Portugal

Taça da Liga

References 

F.C. Vizela
Vizela